Gwyneth Kate Paltrow (born ) is an American actress and businesswoman. She is the recipient of various accolades, including an Academy Award, a Golden Globe Award, and a Primetime Emmy Award.

Paltrow gained notice for her early work in films such as Seven (1995), Emma (1996), Sliding Doors (1998), and A Perfect Murder (1998). She garnered wider acclaim for her performance as Viola de Lesseps in the romantic historical fiction film Shakespeare in Love (1998) which won her several awards, including the Academy Award for Best Actress. This performance was followed by roles in The Talented Mr. Ripley (1999), The Royal Tenenbaums (2001), Shallow Hal (2001), and Sky Captain and the World of Tomorrow (2004).

After becoming a mother in 2004, Paltrow significantly reduced her film workload. She made occasional appearances in films, such as Proof (2005), for which she earned a nomination for the Golden Globe Award for Best Actress in a Motion Picture – Drama. In 2009, Paltrow received a Grammy Award nomination for Best Spoken Word Album for Children for the children's audiobook Brown Bear and Friends. In addition, she won the Primetime Emmy Award for Outstanding Guest Actress in a Comedy Series for her guest role as Holly Holliday on the Fox musical comedy drama television series Glee in 2011. From 2008 to 2019, Paltrow portrayed Pepper Potts in the Marvel Cinematic Universe.

Beginning in 1995, Paltrow has been the face of Estée Lauder's Pleasures perfume; she was previously the face of the American fashion brand Coach. She is the founder and CEO of the lifestyle company Goop, which has been criticised for promoting pseudoscience, and has authored several cookbooks.

Early life
Gwyneth Kate Paltrow was born on September 27, 1972, in Los Angeles, to actress Blythe Danner and film producer-director Bruce Paltrow. She has a younger brother, Jake, who is a director and screenwriter. Paltrow's father was Jewish, while her mother is Christian. She was raised celebrating "both Jewish and Christian holidays." Her brother had a traditional Bar Mitzvah when he turned 13. Her father's Ashkenazi Jewish family emigrated from Belarus and Poland, while her mother has Pennsylvania Dutch (German) as well as some Irish and English ancestry. Paltrow's paternal great-great-grandfather was a Rabbi in Nowogród, Poland, and a descendant of the well-known Paltrowicz family of rabbis from Kraków. She is a half-cousin of actress Katherine Moennig, through her mother, and a second cousin of former U.S. Congresswoman Gabby Giffords (AZ-08) through her father. Through Giffords, she is a second-cousin-in-law of U.S. Senator Mark Kelly of Arizona. Her godfather is director Steven Spielberg. Her uncle is opera singer and actor Harry Danner, whose daughter, actress Hillary Danner, is Paltrow's cousin and close friend. Paltrow recalls their family gatherings: "Hillary and I always had this in common, and to this day ... cooking for people we love, eating, hanging out as a family. It's how we were raised. It's what we do." Another cousin is Rebekah Paltrow Neumann, whose spouse is the Israeli-American millionaire Adam Neumann, founder of WeWork.

Paltrow was raised in a very wealthy household, and lived in Santa Monica, California, where she attended Crossroads School, before enrolling in the Spence School, an all-girls private school in Manhattan.  Later, she studied art history at the University of California, Santa Barbara, before dropping out to act. She is an "adopted daughter" of Talavera de la Reina (Spain), where at 15, she spent a year as an exchange student and learned to speak Spanish. She is also conversant in French, as her family frequently traveled to the South of France throughout her childhood.

Career

1989–1995: Early work
Her career beginnings can be credited to her acting family, as her acting debut was in High (1989), a TV film her father directed, and after spending several summers watching her mother perform at the Williamstown Theatre Festival in Massachusetts, Paltrow made her professional stage debut there in 1990. Her film debut followed with the musical romance film Shout (1991), starring John Travolta, and she was cast by her godfather Steven Spielberg in the commercially successful adventure feature Hook (1991) as the young Wendy Darling. Paltrow's next roles were in one episode of the Scottish soap opera Take The High Road (1992) and the made-for-television movies Cruel Doubt (1992) and Deadly Relations (1993).

Her first plum feature film role was in the noir drama Flesh and Bone (1993) as the much-younger girlfriend of James Caan. Janet Maslin of The New York Times described Paltrow as a scene-stealer "who is Blythe Danner's daughter and has her mother's way of making a camera fall in love with her."

In 1995, she starred in the thriller Se7en, as the wife of a young detective (Brad Pitt), who is partnered with the retiring William Somerset (Morgan Freeman) and then tasked with tracking down a serial killer who uses the seven deadly sins as tropes in his murders. The seventh highest grossing film of the year, Seven also earned her a nomination for the Saturn Award for Best Supporting Actress. She appeared in Moonlight and Valentino, as a grieving chain-smoker, and in Jefferson in Paris, portraying Martha Jefferson Randolph.

1996–2001: Breakthrough and film stardom
In 1996, Paltrow played the title character in the period film adaptation Emma, based on the 1815 novel of the same name by Jane Austen. Director Douglas McGrath decided to bring in Paltrow to audition for the part of Emma Woodhouse, after a suggestion from his agent and after seeing her performance in Flesh and Bone. On his decision to cast the actress, McGrath revealed: "The thing that actually sold me on her playing a young English girl was that she did a perfect Texas accent. I know that wouldn't recommend her to most people ... I knew she had theater training, so she could carry herself. We had many actresses, big and small, who wanted to play this part. The minute she started the read-through, the very first line, I thought, 'Everything is going to be fine; she's going to be brilliant.'" While she recovered from wisdom-tooth surgery, Paltrow had a month to herself to do her own research for the part; she studied horsemanship, dancing, singing, archery and the "highly stylized" manners and dialect during a 3-week rehearsal period. The film was released to critical acclaim and commercial success through arthouse cinemas. Variety proclaimed: "Gwyneth Paltrow shines brightly as Jane Austen's most endearing character, the disastrously self-assured matchmaker Emma Woodhouse. A fine cast, speedy pacing, and playful direction make this a solid contender for the Austen sweepstakes." Paltrow starred in the crime film Hard Eight.

1998 marked a turning point in Paltrow's career as she took on leading roles in five high-profile film releases in the yearGreat Expectations, Sliding Doors, Hush, A Perfect Murder and Shakespeare in Love. In the adaptation of the Charles Dickens novel Great Expectations, also starring Ethan Hawke, Robert De Niro, Anne Bancroft and Chris Cooper, she played the unrequited and haughty childhood love of a New York City painter. The British drama Sliding Doors saw her star as a woman whose life could take two central paths depending on whether or not she catches a train, causing different outcomes. Great Expectations and Sliding Doors both grossed over $55 million worldwide. Paltrow starred opposite Jessica Lange in the thriller Hush, as an unsuspecting woman living with her psychotic mother-in-law. The film made $13.5 million domestically and was generally panned by critics. In another thriller, A Perfect Murder, inspired by Alfred Hitchcock's 1954 film, Dial M for Murder, Paltrow starred alongside Michael Douglas, playing Emily Taylor, who was based on Grace Kelly's character from the original film. Despite a mixed critical response towards A Perfect Murder, the film grossed $128 million globally. She was also considered for the role of Rose DeWitt Bukater in the 1997 film Titanic.

Her most critically acclaimed role in the year was that of the fictional lover of William Shakespeare in Shakespeare in Love, opposite Joseph Fiennes in the titular part. Entertainment Weekly commented, "Best of all is Gwyneth Paltrow, who, at long last, has a movie to star in that's as radiant as she is." The New York Times summed up her performance as Viola thus: "Gwyneth Paltrow, in her first great, fully realized starring performance, makes a heroine so breathtaking that she seems utterly plausible as the playwright's guiding light." Shakespeare in Love made $289 million in box office receipts, and won Paltrow the Screen Actors Guild Award for Outstanding Performance by a Female Actor in a Leading Role, Golden Globe Award for Best Actress in a Motion Picture – Comedy or Musical, and Academy Award for Best Actress, among other honors. The pink Ralph Lauren dress she wore to the 71st Academy Awards in collecting her Oscar was extremely popular and was credited for bringing pink back into fashion.

In 1999, Paltrow co-starred alongside Jude Law, Matt Damon and Cate Blanchett in the psychological thriller The Talented Mr. Ripley, as the fiancée of a rich and spoiled millionaire playboy (Law) whose identity is adopted by a con artist (Damon). While The Guardian, noting the "very underwritten" female roles in the story, found her to be "peaky and pallid", the film received positive reviews and grossed $80 million in North America. She showcased her singing ability in 2000s Duets, which was directed by her father and co-starred singer Huey Lewis. In the film, about "the little known world of karaoke competitions and the wayward characters who inhabit it", she portrayed the estranged daughter of a hustler (Lewis). She performed a cover version of Smokey Robinson's "Cruisin', which was released as a single and went to number one in Australia, while her rendition of the Kim Carnes classic "Bette Davis Eyes" reached number three. Also in 2000, Paltrow co-starred with Ben Affleck in the moderately successful romantic drama Bounce as Abby Janello.

She starred with Jack Black in the comedy Shallow Hal (2001), about a shallow man falling in love with an overweight woman. To play her role, she had to wear a specially designed 25-pound fatsuit and heavy makeup. Shallow Hal opened with $22.5 million and grossed $70.7 million in North America and $141.1 million around the globe. Roger Ebert remarked that she was "truly touching" in the film, which he described as "often very funny, but ... also surprisingly moving at times." In the Wes Anderson dramedy The Royal Tenenbaums (2001), co-starring Gene Hackman, Anjelica Huston, Ben Stiller and Luke Wilson, Paltrow took on the role of the adopted daughter in an estranged family of former child prodigies reuniting with their father. A positive critical response greeted the film upon its release, and it made $71.4 million worldwide.

2002–2007: Career fluctuations
In 2004, it was noted that since her Oscar win for Shakespeare in Love, Paltrow's film career had been less noteworthy and critical acclaim had waned. She said she was unequipped for the pressure, leading to several bad film choices, agreeing with peers who believe the win is, in some ways, a curse. During this time, Paltrow rarely appeared in films, having taken a hiatus to raise her two children. In The Guardian, she said she divided her career into movies for love and films for money: The Royal Tenenbaums, Proof, and Sylvia fell into the former category, while she signed on to View from the Top and Shallow Hal for the latter.

In 2002, Paltrow made small appearances in the documentary Searching for Debra Winger and the action satire comedy Austin Powers in Goldmember, while she starred in the thriller-drama Possession with Aaron Eckhart as a couple of literary scholars who unearth the amorous secret of two Victorian poets as they find themselves falling under a deepening connection. The film made a lukewarm $14.8 million worldwide. In the following year, she headlined the romantic comedy View from the Top, where she obtained the part of woman from a small town who sets out to fulfill her dream of becoming a flight attendant. Budgeted at $30 million, the film only earned $7 million in its opening weekend; it eventually grossed $15.6 domestically and $19,526,014 worldwide. She herself later disparaged the film, calling it "terrible". Paltrow starred as the titular role in Sylvia (2003), a British biographical drama directed by Christine Jeffs and co-starring Daniel Craig chronicling the romance between prominent poets Sylvia Plath and Ted Hughes. Distributed for a limited release in most markets, Sylvia made $2.9 million internationally. The New York Times, in its review for the film, wrote that "her performance goes well beyond mimicry. She has a vivid, passionate presence, even when her lively features have gone slack with depression and her bright blue eyes have glazed over."

In 2004, she starred with her The Talented Mr. Ripley co-star Jude Law and Angelina Jolie in the science fiction film Sky Captain and the World of Tomorrow. Her role in the film was Polly Perkins, the reporter for the fictional New York Chronicle. Law became one of the producers of the film and used his clout to get Paltrow involved. Once she had been suggested for the role, Law did not remember "any other name coming up. It just seems that she was perfect. She was as enthusiastic about the script and about the visual references that were sort of put to her, and jumped on board." She said in an interview, "I thought that this is the time to do a movie like this where it's kind of breaking into new territory and it's not your basic formulaic action-adventure movie." While critical response was positive, with a budget of $70 million, Sky Captain only grossed $58 million at the international box office. Also in 2004, she was recognized as an outstanding woman in entertainment by Women in Film Los Angeles with the Crystal Award.

In the drama Proof (2005), she starred as the depressed daughter of a brilliant, eccentric mathematician (played by Anthony Hopkins). The film was based on the play of the same name, in which Paltrow also played the same character at London's Donmar Warehouse between May and June 2002. On her portrayal in the film version, Eye for Film remarked: "As she has already shown in Sylvia, The Royal Tenenbaums and even Sliding Doors, Paltrow has an uncanny talent for playing women who are coming apart at the seams and her [character] veers from lovably eccentric to more disturbingly unhinged and back again with fluent ease. The scenes, which she and Hopkins share, as two difficult people bound together by affection, dependency, and mutual respect, are entirely believable and all the more touching for it." For her performance, Paltrow received her second Golden Globe nomination for Best Actress in a Motion Picture – Drama.

Paltrow filmed small roles for the 2006 films Love and Other Disasters, Running with Scissors and Infamous, where she sang Cole Porter's "What Is This Thing Called Love?" Her brother Jake Paltrow directed her in his feature debut, the romantic comedy The Good Night (2007), in which she starred opposite Penélope Cruz, Martin Freeman, Danny DeVito and Simon Pegg as the wife of a former keyboard player (Freeman). The film received a two-theater run in North America and garnered mixed reviews from critics. View London felt the actress was "clearly only playing her part as a courtesy to her director brother and it just makes you wish she'd go back to playing lead roles again."

2008–2013: Marvel Cinematic Universe and revival
Paltrow saw a resurgence in her career in 2008, when she was cast in Iron Man as Pepper Potts, Tony Stark's personal assistant, closest friend, and budding love interest. First hesitant to appear in a big-budget project, Paltrow asked Marvel to send her any comics they would consider relevant to her understanding of the character, whom she considered to be very smart, levelheaded, and grounded. She said she liked "the fact that there's a sexuality that's not blatant". The director Jon Favreau wanted Potts and Stark's relationship to be reminiscent of a 1940s screwball comedy, something which Paltrow considered to be fun in an "innocent yet sexy" way. Iron Man was favorably received by critics, and with a worldwide gross of $585 million, it became Paltrow's highest-grossing film until The Avengers (2012). She reprised her role in the sequels Iron Man 2 (2010) and Iron Man 3 (2013). While the second film grossed $623.9 million internationally, the third entry went on to gross $1.215 billion. She also reprised the role in Spider-Man: Homecoming (2017), Avengers: Infinity War (2018) and Avengers: Endgame (2019).

Paltrow starred opposite Joaquin Phoenix in the romantic drama Two Lovers (2008), playing the beautiful but volatile new neighbor of a depressed bachelor. Two Lovers premiered in competition at the 2008 Cannes Film Festival in May, receiving largely positive reviews, especially for Paltrow's and Phoenix's performances;. Los Angeles Times felt: "Phoenix is at his best with Paltrow's bruised sparrow of a girl; he's desperate to take care of her when he can't even take care of himself. She is one of those actresses who understands the power of a look, and the one of regret and then resignation that overtakes her when Leonard professes his love is steeped in sadness." The film was an arthouse success, grossing $16 million worldwide.

In the musical drama Country Strong (2010), Paltrow starred as an emotionally unstable country music star who attempts to resurrect her career. She recorded the song "Country Strong" for the film's soundtrack, and it was released to country radio stations in August 2010. The film received mediocre reviews and grossed a modest $20.2 million in North America. The consensus of review-aggregation website Rotten Tomatoes was: "The cast gives it their all, and Paltrow handles her songs with aplomb, but Country Strongs clichéd, disjointed screenplay hits too many bum notes." At the 83rd Academy Awards, Paltrow performed another song from the film, "Coming Home", which was nominated for Best Original Song.

Paltrow made her first scripted television appearance on Fox's Glee, as substitute teacher Holly Holliday, who fills in for Matthew Morrison's character when he falls ill. Her role was developed by co-creator Ryan Murphy, a personal friend of Paltrow's, who suggested that she showcase her vocal and dancing abilities ahead of the release of Country Strong. In her first episode, "The Substitute", she sang "Nowadays" from the musical Chicago with Lea Michele, CeeLo Green's "Forget You", and a mash-up of "Singin' In the Rain" and Rihanna's "Umbrella" with Morrison and the rest of the cast. Her debut on Glee attracted significant buzz and positive commentary from critics; she won a Primetime Emmy Award for Outstanding Guest Actress in a Comedy Series. Indeed, at the time, Entertainment Weekly Tim Stack and E! Onlines Kristin dos Santos called her appearance Emmy-worthy, with the former rating it among her best performances, and the latter stating that Holly received "some of Glee best-ever one-liners".

Paltrow later performed "Forget You" with CeeLo Green himself and several puppet characters provided by The Jim Henson Company at the 2011 Grammy Awards. She reprised her role twice more that season, performing "Do You Wanna Touch Me (Oh Yeah)" by Gary Glitter, an acoustic version of "Landslide" by Fleetwood Mac, "Kiss" by Prince, and Adele's "Turning Tables". Paltrow was briefly featured in Glee: The 3D Concert Movie after being filmed while she performed "Forget You" as Holly in the 2011 Glee Live! In Concert! tour performances of June 16 and 17, 2011. Later that year, Paltrow appeared in Steven Soderbergh's film Contagion, featuring an ensemble cast consisting of Marion Cotillard, Kate Winslet and her The Talented Mr. Ripley co-stars Matt Damon and Jude Law. The thriller follows the rapid progress of a lethal indirect contact transmission virus that kills within days. Paltrow played Elizabeth Emhoff, a "working mom" and one of the virus' first victims. Contagion received positive reviews and opened atop at the North American box office with $23.1 million; it went on to gross $75.6 million domestically and $135.4 million worldwide.

Paltrow reprised her role of Pepper Potts in The Avengers (2012), which set numerous box office records, including the biggest opening weekend in North America; it grossed over $1.5 billion worldwide, becoming Paltrow's most widely seen film. Also in 2012, she starred in the independent romantic dramedy Thanks for Sharing, opposite Mark Ruffalo as people learning to face a challenging and confusing road as they struggle together against sex addiction. Distributed for a limited release in certain parts of the United States, the film garnered mixed reviews and grossed $1 million domestically. Paste magazine noted that her role: "...exhibits some of the same obsessive diet and exercise habits that Paltrow herself has been accused ofa kind of meta character trait that balances the power in [the main roles'] budding relationship." In April 2013, Paltrow was named People magazine's annual "Most Beautiful Woman".

2014–present: Acting hiatus
In 2014, Paltrow had a two-episode arc in the improvised online series Web Therapy, as Maya Ganesh, "a new-age caricature". In 2015, she starred in Mortdecai, alongside Johnny Depp, Olivia Munn, and Paul Bettany. In it, she portrayed the wife of an unscrupulous art dealer and swindler (Depp). Budgeted at $60 million, the film only grossed $7.7 million in North America and $47.3 million internationally. Paltrow was featured on the track "Everglow", which was included in Coldplay's seventh studio album A Head Full of Dreams (2015). In June 2017, Paltrow announced that she would take a break from acting to focus on her business Goop, stating: "I'm still going to do a little bit here and there, but [the company] really requires almost all of my time." In 2019, Paltrow reprised her role as Pepper Potts in Avengers: Endgame. That same year, she played a supporting role in the Netflix comedy drama series The Politician, playing the mother of Ben Platt's character. In October 2021, Netflix released Sex, Love, and Goop, a sex therapy-themed series produced by and starring Paltrow.

Other ventures

Philanthropy and politics
Paltrow is a Save the Children artist ambassador, raising awareness about World Pneumonia Day. She is on the board of the Robin Hood Foundation, a charitable organization that works to alleviate poverty in New York City. In October 2014, she hosted a Democratic fundraiser attended by President Barack Obama at her private residence in Los Angeles.

In May 2019, Paltrow and actor Bradley Whitford hosted a fundraiser for Democratic presidential candidate Mayor Pete Buttigieg.

In April 2020, Paltrow, along with other celebrities, discussed the COVID-19 pandemic with Dr. Anthony Fauci on a one-hour-long zoom call. Fauci hoped the celebrities would use their social media "megaphones" to encourage proper precautions among their followers.

Audiobooks
In 2009, Paltrow narrated the audiobook The Brown Bear & Friends by Bill Martin Jr., the first of a series of children's audiobooks that she narrated. The Brown Bear & Friends audiobook earned Paltrow a Grammy Award nomination for Best Spoken Word Album for Children. Since, she has also narrated Bill Martin's Brown Bear, Brown Bear, What Do You See?, Baby Bear, Baby Bear, What Do You See?, Panda Bear, Panda Bear, What Do You See?, and Polar Bear, Polar Bear, What Do You Hear?.

Fashion

In May 2005, Paltrow became the face of Estée Lauder's Pleasures perfume. She appeared in Chicago on August 17, 2007, to sign bottles of the perfume, and on July 8, 2008, she promoted Lauder's Sensuous perfume in New York with the company's three other models. Estée Lauder donates a minimum of $500,000 of sales of items from the 'Pleasures Gwyneth Paltrow' collection to breast cancer research. In 2006, she became the face for Bean Pole International, a Korean fashion brand and in 2014, she partnered with Blo Blow Bar, teaming up with the brand's creative branch.

Goop

In September 2008, Paltrow launched the weekly lifestyle newsletter Goop, encouraging readers to 'nourish the inner aspect'. Goop has expanded into a web-based company, Goop.com. According to Paltrow, the company's name came from someone telling her that successful internet companies have double O's in their name, and "is a nickname, like my name is G.P., so that is really where it came from. And I wanted it to be a word that means nothing and could mean anything." Goop has expanded into e-commerce, collaborating with fashion brands, launching pop-up shops, launching a wellness summit, a print magazine, a podcast, and a documentary series streamed on Netflix.

Goop, and by extension Paltrow, have faced backlash for showcasing expensive products and promoting medically and scientifically impossible treatments, many of which have harmful consequences. The controversies have included vaginal steaming, the use of jade eggs, a dangerous coffee enema device, and "Body Vibes", wearable stickers that were claimed to "rebalance the energy frequency in our bodies" and which Goop falsely claimed were made of a NASA-developed material. Goop settled a lawsuit regarding the health claims it made over the jade eggs.

Jill Avery, a brand analyst, has noted how Goop's response to criticism seems designed to "strengthen their brand and draw their customers closer", noting Goop's references to feminism, traditional Asian medicines and Eastern philosophies, and anti-establishment politics to do so. Late Show host Stephen Colbert had repeatedly lampooned Goop products; in 2018 Paltrow appeared in a Late Show sketch seemingly making fun of her company's approach.

On January 24, 2020, Netflix released The Goop Lab, a documentary series. The 6-part show promotes Goop, and covers pseudoscientific topics in energy healing, the use of psychedelic drugs, cold therapy, anti-aging, mediumship, and female sexuality. Critics argued that granting Goop access to Netflix's platform was a "win for pseudoscience". Upon release of the first trailer, and again after the full six-episode series was available, the series sparked controversy concerning the medical and scientific misinformation it presented.

On January 27, 2020, Truth in Advertising watchdog (TINA.org) filed another complaint with the district attorneys of California alleging that Goop has continued to engage in deceptive marketing, even after Goop was sued by the State of California earlier that year and agreed to refrain from "making any claims regarding the efficacy or effects of any of its products without possessing competent and reliable scientific evidence that substantiates the claims" for a period of five years. TINA.org's complaint alleges that Goop claims their products are "clinically-proven" to treat such symptoms as anxiety, depression, OCD and more.

In January 2021, it was announced that Paltrow was an early investor in Thirteen Lune, an e-commerce site focused on makeup, skincare, haircare and wellness products owned by people of color and ally brands. In April 2021, Goop became Thirteen Lune's first ally brand.

Food

In October 2007, Paltrow signed for the PBS television series Spain... on the Road Again, which showcases the food and culture of Spain. In 2008, Paltrow co-wrote the book Spain... A Culinary Road Trip with Mario Batali. In 2011, she wrote a book titled My Father's Daughter: Delicious, Easy Recipes Celebrating Family and Togetherness. That same year she penned the book Notes From the Kitchen Table. Two years later she published a book titled It's All Good: Delicious Easy Recipes That Will Make You Look Good and Feel Great, which promoted an elimination diet that is unsupported by medical evidence. Included in that book was a recipe for avocado toast which was widely copied and adapted as part of a 2010s food trend. Also in 2013, Paltrow wrote a foreword for a book by Ross Mathews, Man Up! Tales of My Delusional Self-Confidence. In 2016, Paltrow published a cookbook: It's All Easy: Delicious Weekday Recipes for the Super-Busy Home Cook.

Negative reaction by a group of scientist and science communication mothers to Paltrow's 2015 video pushing for mandatory labeling of food containing genetically modified organisms led to the creation of a documentary, Science Moms. The film is about mothers who advocate for science-based decision-making concerning the health and nutrition of children.

In February 2021 it was reported that Paltrow was suffering from long COVID, leaving her with "some long-tail fatigue and brain fog". She advocated treatments for it which involved a "ketogenic and plant-based" diet (with no sugar or alcohol), fasting until 11:00 every day and taking infrared saunas. This advice was criticized by NHS England's Professor Stephen Powis.

Personal life
In 2004, Paltrow practiced cupping therapy, attending a film premiere with bruises on her back. , Paltrow practices Transcendental Meditation.

In 2014, Paltrow, whose father was Jewish, was reportedly planning to convert to Judaism.

In 2017, Paltrow revealed that during the filming of Emma (1996), producer Harvey Weinstein made unwanted sexual advances toward her. She confided in her then-fiancé Brad Pitt, who subsequently confronted the producer at an industry event. Weinstein later warned Paltrow not to tell anyone else. She was, in 2017, a major source for an article written by The New York Times investigative journalists Jodi Kantor and Megan Twohey about Harvey Weinstein sexual abuse cases.

In January 2019, retired optometrist Terry Sanderson sued Paltrow for $3.1 million, claiming that three years earlier she collided with him on a ski slope at Deer Valley Resort in Park City, Utah, causing him permanent traumatic brain injury. Paltrow counter-sued Sanderson that February, claiming that he was the one who crashed into her. She sought a symbolic one dollar in damages, as well as repayment of her legal fees.

Paltrow has received backlash from the scientific community and medical professionals for promoting unproven treatments based on pseudoscience through her company Goop.

Relationships and children 
Paltrow became engaged at age 24 to actor Brad Pitt, whom she dated from 1994 to 1997. According to Paltrow, they called off the engagement because she was not ready for marriage. She later said that, as this was her first high-profile relationship with another celebrity, it taught her the need for public discretion about her love life.

Paltrow began dating actor Ben Affleck in October 1997 after meeting at a Miramax dinner, and they worked together on Shakespeare in Love (1998). Although they split in January 1999, months later Paltrow persuaded Affleck to co-star with her in Bounce (2000) and they rekindled their relationship. They eventually broke up in October 2000. In 2015, Paltrow said she and Affleck remain friends.

In October 2002, Paltrow met Chris Martin of the British band Coldplay backstage three weeks after the death of her father, Bruce Paltrow, for which the Coldplay song "Fix You" was written to help Paltrow through her grief. They married in December 2003 in a ceremony at a hotel in Southern California. She was pregnant with their child at the time of their wedding. Paltrow and Martin have two children together: a daughter, Apple, born in 2004, and a son, Moses, born in 2006. Their son's name was inspired by a song Chris Martin wrote for Paltrow. Simon Pegg and Martin's bandmate Jonny Buckland are her daughter's godfathers.

Paltrow cut down on work after becoming a mother. She also suffered from postpartum depression after the birth of her younger child in 2006. In March 2014, Paltrow announced that she and Martin had separated after ten years of marriage, describing the process as "conscious uncoupling." In her official announcement, Paltrow had her doctor, Habib Sadeghi, and his dentist wife, Sherry Sami, explain conscious uncoupling as "the ability to understand that every irritation and argument [within a marriage] was a signal to look inside ourselves and identify a negative internal object that needed healing," Sadeghi explained. "From this perspective, there are no bad guys, just two people, it's about people as individuals, not just the relationship". In April 2015, Paltrow filed for divorce, which was finalized on July 14, 2016.

In 2014, Paltrow began dating producer Brad Falchuk, whom she met on the set of Glee in 2010. The couple went public with their relationship in April 2015, and announced their engagement on January 8, 2018. Their marriage ceremony was held on September 29, 2018 in the Hamptons on Long Island, New York.

Awards and nominations

Filmography

Film

Television

Video game

Discography

Singles

As lead artist

As featured artist

Other album appearances

Music videos

Published works
 
 
 
 Paltrow, Gwyneth (2019). The Clean Plate: Eat, Reset, Heal. Grand Central Life & Style.
 Sadeghi Habib – Author, Paltrow, Gwyneth – Foreword (2017). The Clarity Cleanse: 12 Steps to Finding Renewed Energy, Spiritual Fulfillment and Emotional Healing. .

Notes and References

External links

 
 
 Gwyneth Paltrow's newsletter, Goop
 

 
1972 births
Living people
20th-century American actresses
21st-century American actresses
21st-century American businesspeople
21st-century American businesswomen
21st-century American non-fiction writers
21st-century American singers
21st-century American women singers
21st-century American women writers
Actresses from Los Angeles
Actresses from New York City
Actresses from Santa Monica, California
Alternative detoxification promoters
American child actresses
American cookbook writers
American country singer-songwriters
American expatriates in France
American expatriates in Spain
American expatriates in the United Kingdom
American female models
American film actresses
American food writers
American musical theatre actresses
American people of Barbadian descent
American people of Belarusian-Jewish descent
American people of English descent
American people of Irish descent
American people of Pennsylvania Dutch descent
American people of Polish-Jewish descent
American philanthropists
American stage actresses
American television actresses
American voice actresses
American women country singers
American women non-fiction writers
Audiobook narrators
Best Actress Academy Award winners
Best Musical or Comedy Actress Golden Globe (film) winners
Businesspeople from Los Angeles
Businesspeople from New York City
California Democrats
Crossroads School alumni
Female models from California
Female models from New York (state)
Models from Los Angeles
Models from New York City
Musicians from Santa Monica, California
New York (state) Democrats
Outstanding Performance by a Cast in a Motion Picture Screen Actors Guild Award winners
Outstanding Performance by a Female Actor in a Leading Role Screen Actors Guild Award winners
Paltrow family
Primetime Emmy Award winners
Pseudoscientific diet advocates
Singers from Los Angeles
Singers from New York City
Spence School alumni
University of California, Santa Barbara alumni
Women cookbook writers
Women food writers
Writers from Los Angeles
Writers from New York City
Writers from Santa Monica, California